Lake Waikaramu is a lake in the Northland Region of New Zealand.

See also
List of lakes in New Zealand

References

Waikaramu
Far North District